Josef Haiböck (28 February 1917 – 3 July 2002) was a general in the Austrian Air Force. During World War II, he served as a fighter pilot in the Luftwaffe of Nazi Germany and was a recipient of the Knight's Cross of the Iron Cross. Haiböck joined the Austrian Austrian Armed Forces (Budensheer) in 1956 and retired in 1977 as a Generalmajor. During his career he was credited with 77 aerial victories in 604 missions.

World War II
World War II in Europe began on Friday 1 September 1939 when German forces invaded Poland. On 1 December 1939, Leutnant Haiböck joined Jagdgeschwader 26 "Schlageter" (JG 26—26th Fighter Wing), which had been named after Albert Leo Schlageter on 1 May 1939. There, he was assigned to 9. Staffel (9th squadron). At the time, the Geschwader was commanded by Oberst Eduard Ritter von Schleich, 9. Staffel by Oberleutnant Gerhard Schöpfel, and III. Gruppe, to which the Staffel was subordinated, was led by Major Ernst Freiherr von Berg. The Gruppe was based at Werl and patrolled western German border during the "Phoney War" without having contact with the enemy. On 1 November, III. Gruppe was ordered to Essen-Mülheim Airfield.

Eastern Front
On 30 December 1942, Haiböck was transferred to Jagdgeschwader 52 (JG 52—52nd Fighter Wing) fighting on the Eastern Front. There, he succeeded Oberleutnant Friedrich Bartels as Staffelkapitän (squadron leader) of 1. Staffel. The Staffel was subordinated to I. Gruppe of JG 52 commanded by Hauptmann Helmut Bennemann.

Group commander
On 1 December 1943, Major Günther Rall, the Gruppenkommandeur (group commander) of III. Gruppe of JG 52 was sent on home leave. During his absence, Haiböck temporarily was given command of the Gruppe until Rall's return on 30 January 1944.

On 8 February 1944, Haiböck was transferred to take command of I. Gruppe of Jagdgeschwader 3 "Udet" (JG 3—3rd Fighter Wing) which was fighting in Defense of the Reich. He replaced Hauptmann Joachim von Wehren who had temporarily led the Gruppe after Major Klaus Quaet-Faslem was killed on 30 January. Command of 1. Staffel of JG 52 was passed to Oberleutnant Karl-Heinz Plücker. On 25 February, Haiböck made a forced landing in his Messerschmitt Bf 109 G-6 (Werknummer 410377—factory number) following engine failure near Malsch, district of Karlsruhe. On the ground, he was then attacked by strafing American aircraft and seriously wounded.

Later life and service
In 1956, Haiböck volunteered for military service in the Austrian Air Force, initially holding the rank auf Hauptmann.

Following retirement from military service in 1977, Haiböck became the president of the Austrian Aero Club. In 1986, he opposed the removal of the Alexander Löhr commemorative plaque from the Vienna the garrison church Stiftskirche. Löhr was one of the main creators of the Austrian Air Force and a convicted war criminal. The commemorative plaque had been donated by the Austrian Aero Club in 1955.

Summary of career

Aerial victory claims
According to Spick, Haiböck was credited with 77 aerial victories claimed in 604 combat missions. This figure includes 60 aerial victories on the Eastern Front, and further 16 victories over the Western Allies. Mathews and Foreman, authors of Luftwaffe Aces — Biographies and Victory Claims, researched the German Federal Archives and found records for 73 aerial victory claims, plus twelve further unconfirmed claims. This figure of confirmed claims includes 59 aerial victories on the Eastern Front and 14 over the Western Allies.

Victory claims were logged to a map-reference (PQ = Planquadrat), for example "PQ 73652". These sectors were then subdivided into 36 smaller units to give a location area 3 × 4 km in size.

Awards and decorations
 Iron Cross (1939) 2nd Class & 1st Class
 German Cross in Gold on 17 October 1943 as Hauptmann in the 1./Jagdgeschwader 52
 Knight's Cross of the Iron Cross on 9 June 1944 as Hauptmann and Gruppenkommandeur of the I./Jagdgeschwader 3 "Udet"
 Decoration of Honour for Services to the Republic of Austria in Gold

Notes

References

Citations

Bibliography

 
 
 
 
 
 
 
 
 
 
 
 
 
 
 
 
 
 
 
 
 
 

1917 births
2002 deaths
Military personnel from Linz
German World War II flying aces
Recipients of the Gold German Cross
Recipients of the Knight's Cross of the Iron Cross
Austrian generals
Austrian military personnel of World War II
Recipients of the Decoration for Services to the Republic of Austria